Judy Anderson is a Nêhiyaw Cree artist from the Gordon First Nation in Saskatchewan, Canada, which is a Treaty 4 territory. Anderson is currently an Associate Professor of Canadian Indigenous Studio Art in the Department of Arts at the University of Calgary. Anderson's artwork focuses on issues of spirituality, colonialism, family, and Indigeneity. Her work includes hand-made paper, beadwork, painting, and collaborative projects, such as the ongoing collaboration with her son Cruz, where the pair combine traditional Indigenous methodologies and graffiti. Anderson has also been researching traditional European methods and materials of painting.

Career
She holds a BA and a BFA from the University of Saskatchewan and an MFA from the University of Regina. Anderson was a faculty member at the First Nations University of Canada and the University of Regina. She was hired in 2017 by the University of Calgary to teach Studio and Indigenous Art History.

Anderson was the Founding director of Platteforum in 2002, a non profit arts organization geared toward educating the youth

Anderson works in painting, beadwork, augmented reality, and installation art. She focuses on issues of spirituality, family, graffiti and popular representations of Aboriginal people, all of which are created with the purpose of honoring the people in her life. Her work has been included in national projects remembering missing and murdered Indigenous women in Canada.

She and her son Cruz Anderson work on glass beaded graffiti art on moose hide. The pair collaborated on a piece which honored Anderson's grandmother who was murdered when Judy was 12. Her pieces shed light on murdered and missing Indigenous peoples and was featured in an exhibit called "Walking with our Sisters" in 2013.

In 2014, Anderson was invited to teach at The Prince's School of Traditional Arts in London, England where she taught Prince Charles how to sew beads and porcupine quills on a moose hide.

Anderson's work is represented in the permanent collection of the National Gallery of Canada.

Exhibitions 
 Critical Faculties (Plain Red Gallery, First Nations University of Canada) 2012
 The Synthetic Age (MacKenzie Art Gallery) 2013 
 Walking With Our Sisters (Plain Red Gallery, First Nations University of Canada) 2013 
 The Sole Project (The Art Gallery of Regina) 2016
 Bead Speak (Slate Fine Art Gallery) 2016 
 Working Mom (Last Mountain Lake Gallery) 2017
 Beading Now (La Guilde) 2019
 Bead Speak 2.0 (Slate Gallery) 2020
 BACA (Biennale d’art contemporain autochtone / Contemporary Native Art Biennial): Honouring Kinship (Art Mûr) 2020
 Biennial of Contemporary Art (Remai Modern) 2020
 The Radical Stitch (Mackenzie Art Gallery) 2022

Awards 
In 2016 Anderson received the Denver Art Museum Gold Key Award, awarded to only those who have made significant contributions to contemporary art in Colorado

In 2017, Anderson won the National Salt Spring Award

References

Living people
Cree people
Artists from Saskatchewan
University of Saskatchewan alumni
University of Regina alumni
Academic staff of the University of Calgary
Canadian women artists
Canadian women academics
Year of birth missing (living people)
First Nations academics
First Nations women artists